Fabio Mascheroni (born 17 February 1977) is a former Italian male long-distance runner who competed at individual senior level at the IAAF World Half Marathon Championships.

Biography
Mascheroni also won an national title at senior level. He also won two medals with the national team at the European 10,000m Cup.

National titles
Italian Athletics Championships
Half marathon: 2005

See also
Italian team at the running events

References

External links
 

1977 births
Living people
Italian male long-distance runners